Linnea Gustafsson (born 20 February 1986 in Fole) is a Swedish orienteering competitor. She won a bronze medal in the middle distance and finished fifth in the sprint at the World Games in 2009. She won a silver medal in sprint at the 2009 World Orienteering Championships in Miskolc, Hungary.

References

External links
 
 

1986 births
Living people
Sportspeople from Gotland County
Swedish orienteers
Female orienteers
Foot orienteers
World Orienteering Championships medalists
World Games medalists in orienteering
World Games bronze medalists
Competitors at the 2009 World Games
20th-century Swedish women
21st-century Swedish women